VfL Sindelfingen is a German sports club from Sindelfingen, Baden–Württemberg. The club was founded in 1862 and has more than 9,000 members, making it one of biggest sports clubs in Germany. VfL Sindelfingen has departments for various sports including football (soccer), volleyball, basketball, swimming, athletics, table tennis, and badminton.

Football

Women
The women's football section is one of the most successful departments in the club. They played in the Bundesliga, Germany's premier football league for women, from its inception in 1990 till 1997. They were relegated after the 1996–97 season and struggled for some years. When the second Bundesliga was incepted in 2004 Sindelfingen was one of the founding members and even managed promotion to the Bundesliga after the first season. After a year in the Bundesliga they were relegated back to the second league, where they played 2012, when they were again promoted to the premier category.

The team's current kit is light blue-white for home games and white or black-red for away games.

Statistics

Men
The men's team gained promotion to the Verbandsliga Württemberg (VI) after the 2006–07 season, where they are still playing.

Swimming
The swimming team of Sindelfingen is a member of the Bundesliga. The women are part of the second Bundesliga.

External links

VfL Sindelfingen's official website

 
Football clubs in Germany
Women's football clubs in Germany
Football clubs in Baden-Württemberg
Multi-sport clubs in Germany
1862 establishments in Germany
Association football clubs established in 1862
19th-century establishments in Württemberg
Frauen-Bundesliga clubs